White Christmas is the fifth album and first Christmas album by country singer Martina McBride issued by RCA Nashville  in 1998. The album was reissued in 1999 with new artwork and two new tracks. It was re-released for the second time in October 2007 with newer artwork and four new tracks added. In 2013, it was reissued for a third time as The Classic Christmas Album. The re-release added her Elvis Presley duet, "Blue Christmas", which was originally released on his posthumous album Christmas Duets, while removing the track "Jingle Bells" and revising the track listing.

In the U.S. the album White Christmas was certified Gold by Recording Industry Association of America (RIAA) on November 9, 1999; then Platinum by the RIAA on November 10, 2003; and then double-Platinum by the RIAA on December 12, 2018. The album has sold 1,827,700 copies in the U.S. as of November 2017.

Track listings

Original 1998 release

1999 re-release

2007 re-release

The Classic Christmas Album (2013 re-release)

Personnel 
 Martina McBride – lead vocals
 Jim Medlin – acoustic piano
 Steve Nathan – synthesizers
 Mark Jordan – synthesizers
 Matt Rollings – acoustic piano
 Brent Mason – electric guitars 
 Biff Watson – acoustic guitars
 Joe Chemay – bass
 Shannon Forrest – drums
 Lonnie Wilson – drums
 Sam Bacco – percussion
 Eric Darken – percussion 
 Karen Winkleman – recorder 
 Skip Cleavnger – penny whistle 
 Lee Levine – clarinet
 Ann Richards – flute
 Bobby Taylor – oboe
 Jim Ferguson – backing vocals
 Mark Ivey – backing vocals 
 Marabeth Jordan – backing vocals
 Louis Nunley – backing vocals 
 Lisa Silver – backing vocals
 Dennis Wilson – backing vocals

The Nashville String Machine 
 Dennis Burnside – string arrangements and conductor
 Carl Gorodetzky – contractor 
 Chris Dunn – music preparation 
 John Catchings, Anthony LaMarchina, Bob Mason and Julie Tanner – cello 
 Craig Nelson – string bass
 Mary Alice Hoepfinger – harp
 Monisa Angell, Jim Grosjean, Gary Vanosdale and Kristin Wilkinson – viola 
 David Angell, Janet Askey, Carolyn Bailey, Joann Cruthirds, David Davidson, Conni Ellisor, Carl Gorodetzky, Gerald Greer, Lee Larrison, Cate Myer, Pamela Sixfin, Elisabeth Small, Alan Umstead, Cathy Umstead, Mary Kathryn Vanosdale and Karen Winkleman – violin

Production 
 Martina McBride – producer 
 Paul Worley – producer
 Rob Christie – producer 
 Patrick Williams – producer 
 Clarke Schleicher – recording, additional engineer, mixing 
 Jim Burnett – additional engineer 
 Tony Green – additional engineer, mix assistant 
 Mike Poole – additional engineer
 Ed Simonton – additional engineer
 Sandy Jenkins – additional assistant engineer, mix assistant 
 Eric Bickel – recording assistant 
 Greg Fogie – recording assistant 
 Erik Hellerman – recording assistant 
 Greg Parker – recording assistant 
 Scott Phillips – recording assistant 
 Glenn Spinner – recording assistant
 Carlos Grier – digital editing
 Eric Conn – digital editing
 Denny Purcell – mastering
 Jonathan Russell – mastering assistant 
 Deb Boyle – production coordinator 
 Paige Connors – production coordinator
 Susan Eaddy – art direction
 Mary Hamilton – art direction 
 Julie Wanca – design 
 Andrew Eccles – photography 
 Kristin Barlowe – 2007 photography 
 Claudia Fowler – wardrobe stylist
 Earl Cox – hair stylist 
 Mary Beth Felts – make-up 
 Bruce Allen – management

Studios
 Recorded at Ocean Way, Emerald Studios and The Tracking Room (Nashville, Tennessee).
 Additional engineering at The Money Pit, Emerald Studios, Masterfonics, Seventeen Grand Recording, Sound Stage Studios and The Love Shack (Nashville, Tennessee).
 Mixed at Sound Stage Studios and The Money Pit.
 Mastered and Digitally Edited at Georgetown Masters (Nashville, Tennessee).

Charts and certifications

Weekly charts

White Christmas

The Classic Christmas Album

Year-end charts

Charted songs

Certifications and sales

Release history

References

Martina McBride albums
1998 Christmas albums
RCA Records Christmas albums
Christmas albums by American artists
Country Christmas albums
Albums produced by Paul Worley